Allen Maldonado (born May 20, 1983) is an American actor and filmmaker best known for his roles as Curtis in Black-ish and Bobby in The Last O.G. He is also an entrepreneur and runs his own clothing line and an app called Everybody Digital.

Life and career
Maldonado grew up in California. He was mostly raised by his mother, as he lost his father at a young age. Maldonado is of Puerto Rican and African-American descent.

His first big role was in Friday After Next and he credits Ice Cube for giving him his "first shot on set." Soon after, Maldonado began making short films that appeared at numerous film circuits and won various awards. However, he found this dissatisfying as once the short film ran it would stop and cease to play elsewhere. While working on the show Black-ish, series creator Kenya Barris inspired him to create an app that specialized in getting short films notoriety. The app dubbed Everybody Digital launched on October 3, 2017, and has been described as "the Netflix of short films."

Maldonado joined the cast of the 2018 remake of the 1972 film Super Fly. He appears in the TBS series The Last O.G. as Cousin Bobby, a character that develops along with Tracy Morgan's lead character Tray.

Filmography

Acting credits

Filmmaking credits

References

External links

Living people
1983 births
Male actors from California
People from Bellflower, California
American people of Puerto Rican descent
African-American male actors